Salinópolis is a municipality in the state of Pará in the Northern region of Brazil.

Climate
Salinópolis has a tropical monsoon climate (Am) with moderate to little rainfall from July to December and heavy to very heavy rainfall from January to June.

Transportation
Salinópolis is served by Salinópolis Airport.

See also

List of municipalities in Pará

References

Municipalities in Pará
Populated coastal places in Pará